Kim Tae-gyu (born 19 May 1978) is a South Korean boxer. He competed in the men's flyweight event at the 2000 Summer Olympics.

References

1978 births
Living people
South Korean male boxers
Olympic boxers of South Korea
Boxers at the 2000 Summer Olympics
Place of birth missing (living people)
Asian Games medalists in boxing
Boxers at the 2002 Asian Games
Asian Games bronze medalists for South Korea
Medalists at the 2002 Asian Games
Flyweight boxers